Skanda may refer to:

 Kartikeya, or Skanda, the Hindu god of war
 Skanda Purana, a Hindu Purana (Scripture) dedicated to the deity
 Skanda (Buddhism), a Deva and/or Bodhisattva popular in Chinese Buddhism
 Skande, or Skanda, a village and fortress in Georgia
 Skandalove, Italian drag queen

See also
 Skandha, in Buddhist phenomenology and soteriology, the five "aggregates" that give rise to craving and clinging
 Skandha (Jainism), in Jain phenomenology and soteriology, the matter "aggregate", the only kind of aggregate admitted

de:Skanda